Jasper Bovenhuis (born 27 July 1991) is a Dutch former racing cyclist, who rode professionally between 2010 and 2016, and 2018 to 2020 for six different teams. He rode at the 2013 UCI Road World Championships, and in 2015, he rode for UCI WorldTeam  as a stagiaire.

Major results

2008
 1st Overall Driedaagse van Axel
1st Young rider classification
 2nd Time trial, National Junior Road Championships
2009
 1st Overall Driedaagse van Axel
 9th Overall Trofeo Karlsberg
2011
 3rd Châteauroux Classic
 5th Paris–Tours Espoirs
 6th Rund um den Finanzplatz Eschborn-Frankfurt
 9th Rogaland GP
 9th Ronde van Midden-Nederland
2012
 10th Ronde van Noord-Holland
2014
 10th Overall Olympia's Tour
2015
 1st Arno Wallaard Memorial
 8th Dwars door Drenthe
2016
 1st  Sprints classification, Tour of Britain
2018
 8th Ronde van Overijssel
 10th Ronde van Drenthe

References

External links

1991 births
Living people
Dutch male cyclists
People from Staphorst
Cyclists from Overijssel